Jerome Dismas Bwanausi (born 1 November 1959) is a Tanzanian CCM politician and Member of Parliament for Lulindi constituency since 2010.

References

1959 births
Living people
Chama Cha Mapinduzi MPs
Tanzanian MPs 2010–2015
Tosamaganga Secondary School alumni
Mazengo Secondary School alumni